Silacayoapam District is located in the northwest of the Mixteca Region of the State of Oaxaca, Mexico. 

The climate is temperate, with average temperature of 20.6°C. The warmest area is the municipality of San Nicolás Hidalgo (21.1°C) and the coolest is San Mateo Nejapam (19.6°C).
Annual rainfall is about 920 mm, with highest rainfall in September.
The region has coniferous forests that include ceiba, huanacastle, pine, strawberry, moral, and oak.
Wildlife include rattlesnake, quail, frog, lynx, mountain rabbit, coyote, gray fox, owl, red squirrel, eagle, hawk, necklace dove and owl.

Municipalities

The district includes the following municipalities:
 
 Calihualá
 Guadalupe de Ramírez
 Ixpantepec Nieves
 San Agustín Atenango
 San Andrés Tepetlapa
 San Francisco Tlapancingo
 San Juan Bautista Tlachichilco
 San Juan Cieneguilla
 San Juan Ihualtepec
 San Lorenzo Victoria
 San Mateo Nejapam
 San Miguel Ahuehuetitlán
 San Nicolás Hidalgo
 Santa Cruz de Bravo
 Santiago del Río
 Santiago Tamazola
 Santiago Yucuyachi 
Silacayoapam
Zapotitlán Lagunas

References

Districts of Oaxaca
Mixteca Region